Berlin Crisis may refer to:
Berlin Blockade of 1948-1949
Second Berlin Crisis (1958–1963)
Berlin Crisis of 1958–1959
Berlin Crisis of 1961, a part of the Second Berlin Crisis